Feedforward is the provision of context of what one wants to communicate prior to that communication.

Feedforward may also refer to:
 Feedforward (behavioral and cognitive science), the concept of learning from the future and one's desired behavior
 Feed forward (control), a type of element or pathway within a control system
 Feedforward (management), giving a pre-feedback to a person or an organization from which you are expecting a feedback
 Feedforward neural network, a type of artificial neural network